The morphology of the Welsh language shows many characteristics perhaps unfamiliar to speakers of English or continental European languages like French or German, but has much in common with the other modern Insular Celtic languages: Irish, Scottish Gaelic, Manx, Cornish, and Breton. Welsh is a moderately inflected language. Verbs conjugate for person, tense and mood with affirmative, interrogative and negative conjugations of some verbs. A majority of prepositions inflect for person and number. There are few case inflections in Literary Welsh, being confined to certain pronouns.

Modern Welsh can be written in two varieties – Colloquial Welsh or Literary Welsh. The grammar described on this article is for Literary Welsh.

Initial consonant mutation

Initial consonant mutation is a phenomenon common to all Insular Celtic languages (there is no evidence of it in the ancient Continental Celtic languages of the early first millennium). The first consonant of a word in Welsh may change depending on grammatical context (such as when the grammatical object directly follows the grammatical subject), when preceded by certain words, e.g. ,  "I have a house".

Welsh has three mutations across four paradigms: the soft mutation, the nasal mutation, and the aspirate (or spirant) mutation; and the mixed mutation where the aspirate mutation is applied where possible, else the soft mutation is applied. These are represented in writing, as shown in the table below along with their corresponding IPA symbols.

{| class="wikitable"
|- style="background: #efefef;"
! Radical
! Soft
! Nasal
! Aspirate
! Mixed
|-
| p 
| b 
| mh 
| ph 
| ph 
|-
| t 
| d 
| nh 
| th 
| th 
|-
| c 
| g 
| ngh 
| ch 
| ch 
|-
| b 
| f 
| m 
| 
| f 
|-
| d 
| dd 
| n 
| 
| dd 
|-
| g 
| ∅*
| ng 
|
|  ∅*
|-
| m 
| f 
| 
| 
| f 
|-
| ll 
| l 
|
|
| l 
|-
| rh 
| r 
|
|
|  r 
|}

A blank cell indicates no change.

*The soft mutation for g is the simple deletion of the initial sound. For example,  "garden" becomes  "the garden". But this can behave as a consonant under certain circumstances, e.g. "gellir" (one can) becomes "ni ellir" (one cannot) not "*nid ellir".

Soft mutation 

The soft mutation is by far the most common mutation in Welsh.  When words undergo soft mutation, the general pattern is that voiceless plosives become voiced plosives, and voiced plosives become fricatives or disappear; sonorants the lateral fricative  becomes a plain lateral . The full list is shown in the above table.

Common situations where the full soft mutation occurs are as follows – this list is by no means exhaustive:

 adjectives (and nouns used genitivally as adjectives) qualifying feminine singular nouns
 words immediately following the prepositions  "for, about",  "on",  "to", / "under", / "over", / "through",  "without",  "until",  "by",  "at",  "to, for",  "of, from"
 nouns used with the number two ( / )
 nouns following adjectives (N.B. most adjectives follow the noun)
 nouns after the possessives , informal singular "your", and  when it means "his"
 an object of an inflected verb
 the second element in many compound words
 when an adverbial phrase comes between two elements, the second element is mutated (e.g.  "it is necessary to go" becomes  "it is necessary to me to go")
 verbs after the interrogative particle  (e.g.  "you walked",  "did you walk?")

In some cases a limited soft mutation takes place. This differs from the full soft mutation in that words beginning with rh and ll do not mutate.

Situations where the limited soft mutation occurs are as follows.

 feminine singular nouns with the definite article or the number one
 nouns or adjectives used predicatively or adverbially after 
 after the prefixes can- and dar-

The occurrence of the soft mutation often obscures the origin of placenames to non-Welsh-speaking visitors.

Nasal mutation 
The nasal mutation normally occurs:

 after  "my" e.g.  "a bed",  "my bed"
 after the locative preposition  "in" e.g.  "Tywyn",  "in Tywyn"
 after the negating prefix , e.g.  "fair",  "unfair".

Notes
 In the spoken language the possessive adjective  "my" is most often heard as if spelt  (i.e. ) or, in the presence of the nasal mutation, omitted all together - e.g.  "my father" ( omitted),  "my apple",  "my sister". In the literary language, however, it is always given as : .
 The preposition  becomes  if the following noun (mutated or not) begins with m, and  if the following noun begins with ng, e.g.  "Bangor",  "in Bangor",  "Cardiff", yng Nghaerdydd "in Cardiff".  
  In words beginning with an-, the n is dropped before the mutated consonant, e.g.  +  "personal" →  "impersonal", although it is retained before a non-mutating letter, e.g.  +  "certain" →  "uncertain", or if the resultant mutation allows for a double n, e.g.  +  "undo" →  "integral". (This final rule does not apply to words that would potentially produce a cluster of four consonants, e.g.  +  "order" →  "disorder", not *annhrefn.)

Under nasal mutation, voiced stop consonants become voiced nasals, and plain stops become voiceless nasals.

Grammatical considerations 

For example:

In the sentence , trwyn has undergone nasal mutation.
In the sentence , plastig has undergone soft, not nasal, mutation.
In the sentence , cynnwys is not mutated.
The  form often used instead of  after vowels does not cause nasal mutation.  For example:
  (not *i'm ngwlad)

Aspirate mutation 

The aspirate mutation turns the voiceless plosives into voiceless fricatives.  In writing, the aspirate mutation is shown by an addition of an h in the spelling (c, p, t → ch, ph, th), the resultant forms are single phonemes: ( → ).

The aspirate mutation occurs:

 after the possessive adjective  when it means "her"
 after  "and"
 after  "with, by means of"
 after the preposition  "with"
 for masculine nouns after the number three
 after the number six

Notes
 The aspirate mutation resulting from  "her" distinguishes it from  "his" (which causes soft mutation) - e.g.  "her father" (as opposed to  "his father").
  "and" and  "with, by means of" become  and  before vowels, respectively - e.g.  "and an apple";  "don't wait".
 Feminine nouns are preceded by the numeral , not ;  does not cause mutation - e.g.  "three cats", but  "three dogs".
 The Welsh numeral  becomes  before a noun. This is similar to the numeral  which is always  before a noun - e.g.  "six nations",  "six mutations",  "six children".

Mixed mutation 

Initial consonants which can take the aspirate mutation do so; other consonants take the soft mutation if possible - all other consonants do not mutate.

In the modern spoken language, the aspirate mutation is declining and is (outside of set phrases) often omitted or replaced by the soft mutation. However, in the formal literary language (here presented) all mutations are preserved and used as expected without regional or dialectal intrusion.

Phonetic values of mutated phonemes 

The true phonetic values of some of the Welsh phonemes, particularly  are often debated in academia. It is often claimed that the voiceless nasals are actually aspirated .

The article

Welsh has no indefinite article. The rules governing their usage are:

 When the previous word ends in a vowel, regardless of the quality of the word following,  is used, e.g.  ("the cat is outside"). This rule takes precedence over the other two below.
 When the word begins with a vowel,  is used, e.g.  "the bear".
 In all other places,  is used, e.g.  ("the boy").
The letter w represents both a consonant  and the vowels  and  - a preceding definite article will reflect this by following the rules above, e.g.    "the wall" but   or  "the egg". However, pre-vocalic  is used before both the consonantal and vocalic values represented by i, e.g.   "the hen" and   "the anguish". It is also always used before the consonant h, e.g.   "the summer".
The first rule may be applied with greater or less frequency in various literary contexts. For example, poetry might use  more often to help with metre, e.g.  "The same power is in my God" from a hymn by William Williams Pantycelyn. On the other hand, sometimes its use is more restricted in very formal contexts, e.g.  "Behold, these are the ungodly" in Psalm 73.12.

The article triggers the soft mutation when it is used with feminine singular nouns, e.g.  "(a) princess" becomes  "the princess", but no mutation in the plural:  "the princesses".

Nouns

Like most Indo-European languages, all nouns belong to a certain grammatical gender; in this case, masculine or feminine. A noun's gender conforms to its referent's natural gender when it has one, e.g.  "mother" is feminine. There are also semantic, morphological and phonological clues to help determine a noun's gender, e.g.  "milk" is masculine as are all liquids,  "wedding" is feminine because it ends in the suffix , and  "theatre" is feminine because the stressed vowel is an e. Many everyday nouns, however, possess no such clues.

Sometimes a noun's gender may vary depending on meaning, for example  when masculine means "work", but when feminine, it means "occasion, time". The words for languages behave like feminine nouns (i.e. mutate) after the article, e.g.  "the Welsh language", but as masculine nouns (i.e. without mutation of an adjective) when qualified, e.g.  "good Welsh". The gender of some nouns depends on a user's dialect, and although in the literary language there is some standardization, some genders remain unstable, e.g.  "page".

Welsh has two systems of grammatical number. Singular/plural nouns correspond to the singular/plural number system of English, although unlike English, Welsh noun plurals are unpredictable and formed in several ways.

This can help distinguish meaning in some cases, e.g. whereas  means both "tribe" and "load",  means "tribes" and  means "loads".

The other system of grammatical number is the collective/singulative. Most nouns which belong in this system are frequently found in groups, for example,  "children" and  "a child", or  "trees, forest" and  "a tree",  "a beechwood, beech trees, beeches" and  "a beech tree". In dictionaries, the collective form, being the root form, is given first.

Adjectives

Adjectives normally follow the noun they qualify, e.g.  "(a) young son", while a small number precede it, usually causing soft mutation, e.g.  "(an) old son". The position of an adjective may even determine its meaning, e.g.  "(a) lonely son" as opposed to  "(an) only son".  In poetry, however, and to a lesser extent in prose, most adjectives may occur before the noun they modify, but this is a literary device. It is also seen in some place names, such as Harlech (hardd + llech) and Glaslyn.

When modifying a noun (i.e. in an attributive construction) belonging to the feminine, adjectives undergo soft mutation, for example,  "small" and 
following the masculine noun  and the feminine noun , both meaning "table":

{| class="wikitable"
|- style="background: #efefef;"
!
! scope="col" | Masculine
! scope="col" | Feminine
|-
! scope="row" style="background: #efefef;" | Singular
| 
| 
|-
! scope="row" style="background: #efefef;" | Plural
| 
| 
|}

For the most part, adjectives are uninflected, though there are a few with distinct masculine/feminine and/or singular/plural forms. A feminine adjective is formed from a masculine by means of vowel change, usually "w" to "o" (e.g. crwn "round" to cron) or "y" to "e" (e.g. gwyn "white" to gwen). A plural adjective may employ vowel change (e.g. marw "dead" to meirw), take a plural ending (e.g. coch "red" to cochion) or both (e.g. glas "blue, green" to gleision).

{| class="wikitable"
|- style="background: #efefef;"
!
! scope="col" | Masculine
! scope="col" | Feminine
|-
! scope="row" style="background: #efefef;" | Singular
| 
| 
|-
! scope="row" style="background: #efefef;" | Plural
| 
| 
|}

Adjective comparison in Welsh is fairly similar to the English system except that there is an additional degree, the equative (Welsh y radd gyfartal). Native adjectives with one or two syllables usually receive the endings  "as/so" (preceded by the word cyn in a sentence, which causes a soft mutation  except with ll and rh: , "as tall as a giant"),  "-er" and  "-est". The stem of the adjective may also be modified when inflected, including by provection, where final or near-final b, d, g become p, t, c respectively.

{| class="wikitable"
|- style="background: #efefef;"
! scope="col" | Positive
! scope="col" | Equative
! scope="col" | Comparative
! scope="col" | Superlative
! scope="col" | English
|-
| 
| 
| 
| 
| "tall"
|-
| 
| 
| 
| 
| "weak"
|-
| 
| 
| 
| 
| "heavy"
|-
| 
| 
| 
| 
| "wet"
|-
| 
| 
| 
| 
| "cheap"
|-
| 
| 
| 
| 
| "fair"
|}

Generally, adjectives with two or more syllables use a different system, whereby the adjective is preceded by the words  "as/so" (which causes a soft mutation except with ll and rh),  "more" and  "most".

{| class="wikitable"
|- style="background: #efefef;"
! scope="col" | Positive
! scope="col" | Equative
! scope="col" | Comparative
! scope="col" | Superlative
! scope="col" | English
|-
| 
| 
| 
| 
| "interesting"
|-
| 
| 
| 
| 
| "sustainable"
|-
| 
| 
| 
| 
| "literary"
|}

The literary language tends to prefer the use inflected adjectives where possible.

There are also a number of irregular adjectives.

{| class="wikitable"
|- style="background: #efefef;"
! scope="col" | Positive
! scope="col" | Equative
! scope="col" | Comparative
! scope="col" | Superlative
! scope="col" | English
|-
| 
| 
| 
| 
| "good"
|-
| 
| 
| 
| 
| "bad"
|-
| 
| 
| 
| 
| "big"
|-
| 
| 
| 
| 
| "small"
|-
| 
| 
| 
| 
| "long"
|-
| 
| 
| 
| 
| "fast"
|}

These are the possessive adjectives:
{| class="wikitable"
|- style="background: #efefef;"
| colspan="2" |
! scope="col" | Singular
! scope="col" | Plural
|-
! colspan="2" scope="row" style="background: #efefef;" | First Person
|  (n)
| 
|-
! colspan="2" scope="row" style="background: #efefef;" | Second Person
|  (s)
| 
|-
! rowspan="2" scope="row" style="background: #efefef;" | Third Person
! scope="row" style="background: #efefef;" | Masculine
|  (s)
| rowspan="2" | 
|-
! scope="row" style="background: #efefef;" | Feminine
|  (a)
|}

The possessive adjectives precede the noun they qualify, which is sometimes followed by the corresponding form of the personal pronoun, especially to emphasize the possessor, e.g.  "my bread",  "your bread",  "his bread" etc.

,  and feminine  add an h a following word beginning with a vowel, e.g.  "name",  "her name".

The demonstrative adjectives are inflected for gender and number:

{| class="wikitable"
|- style="background: #efefef;"
!
! scope="col" | Masculine
! scope="col" | Feminine
! scope="col" | Plural
|-
! scope="row" style="background: #efefef;" | Proximal
| 
| 
| 
|-
! scope="row" style="background: #efefef;" | Distal
| 
| 
| 
|}

These follow the noun they qualify, which also takes the article. For example, the masculine word  "book" becomes  "this book",  "that book",  "these books" and  "those books".

Pronouns

Personal pronouns

The Welsh personal pronouns are:

{| class="wikitable"
|- style="background: #efefef;"
| colspan="2" |
! scope="col" | Singular
! scope="col" | Plural
|-
! colspan="2" scope="row" style="background: #efefef;" | First Person
| 
| 
|-
! colspan="2" scope="row" style="background: #efefef;" | Second Person
| 
| 
|-
! rowspan="2" scope="row" style="background: #efefef;" | Third Person
! scope="row" style="background: #efefef;" | Masculine
| 
| rowspan="2" | 
|-
! scope="row" style="background: #efefef;" | Feminine
| 
|}

The Welsh masculine-feminine gender distinction is reflected in the pronouns.

The English dummy or expletive "it" construction in phrases like "it's raining" or "it was cold last night" also exists in Welsh and other Indo-European languages like French, German, and Dutch, but not in Italian, Spanish, Portuguese, or the Slavic languages. Unlike other masculine-feminine languages, which often default to the masculine pronoun in the construction, Welsh uses the feminine singular , thus producing sentences like:

 
 It's raining.

 
 It was cold last night.

Notes on the forms

The form  is used as an optional affirmative marker before a conjugated verb at the start of a clause, but may also be found elsewhere in modern writing, influenced by spoken Welsh.

Once more, modern authors may prefer to use the spoken form , although this cannot be done after literary forms of verbs and conjugated prepositions.

Similarly, there is some tendency to follow speech and drop the "w" from the second-person plural pronoun  in certain modern semi-literary styles.

In any case, pronouns are often dropped in the literary language, as the person and number can frequently be discerned from the verb or preposition alone.

vs. 

, in addition to serving as the second-person plural pronoun, is also used as a singular in formal situations. Conversely,  can be said to be limited to the informal singular, such as when speaking with a family member, a friend, or a child. This usage corresponds closely to the practice in other European languages. The third colloquial form, is not found in literary Welsh.

Reflexive pronouns

{| class="wikitable"
|- style="background: #efefef;"
! scope="col" colspan="1" | 
! scope="col" | Singular
! scope="col" | Plural
|-
! scope="row" style="background: #efefef;" | First Person
| 
| 
|-
! scope="row" style="background: #efefef;" | Second Person
| 
| 
|-
! scope="row" style="background: #efefef;" | Third Person
| 
| 
|}
There is no gender distinction in the third person singular.

Reduplicated pronouns

Literary Welsh has reduplicated pronouns that are used for emphasis, usually as the subject of a focussed sentence. For example:

"(It was) You that created us."

"Did I not choose you?"

{| class="wikitable"
|- style="background: #efefef;"
| colspan="2" |
! scope="col" | Singular
! scope="col" | Plural
|-
! colspan="2" scope="row" style="background: #efefef;" | First Person
| 
| 
|-
! colspan="2" scope="row" style="background: #efefef;" | Second Person
| 
| 
|-
! rowspan="2" scope="row" style="background: #efefef;" | Third Person
! scope="row" style="background: #efefef;" | Masculine
| 
| rowspan="2" | 
|-
! scope="row" style="background: #efefef;" | Feminine
| 
|}

Conjunctive pronouns

Welsh has special conjunctive forms of the personal pronouns. They are perhaps more descriptively termed 'connective or distinctive pronouns' since they are used to indicate a connection between or distinction from another nominal element. Full contextual information is necessary to interpret their function in any given sentence.

Less formal variants are given in brackets. Mutation may also, naturally, affect the forms of these pronouns (e.g. minnau may be mutated to finnau)

{| class="wikitable"
|- style="background: #efefef;"
| colspan="2" |
! scope="col" | Singular
! scope="col" | Plural
|-
! colspan="2" scope="row" style="background: #efefef;" | First Person
| 
| 
|-
! colspan="2" scope="row" style="background: #efefef;" | Second Person
| 
| 
|-
! rowspan="2" scope="row" style="background: #efefef;" | Third Person
! scope="row" style="background: #efefef;" | Masculine
| 
| rowspan="2" | 
|-
! scope="row" style="background: #efefef;" | Feminine
| 
|}

The emphatic pronouns can be used with possessive adjectives in the same way as the simple pronouns are used (with the added function of distinction or connection).

Demonstrative pronouns

In addition to having masculine and feminine forms of this and that, Welsh also has separate set of this and that for intangible, figurative, or general ideas.

{| class="wikitable"
|- style="background: #efefef;"
| scope="col" |
! scope="col" | Masculine
! scope="col" | Feminine
! scope="col" | Intangible
|-
! scope="row" style="background: #efefef;" | this
| 
| 
| 
|-
! scope="row" style="background: #efefef;" | that
| 
| 
| 
|-
! scope="row" style="background: #efefef;" | these
! colspan="2" style="background: #f9f9f9; font-weight: normal" | 
! rowspan="2" style="background: #efefef;" | 
|-
! scope="row" style="background: #efefef;" | those
! colspan="2" style="background: #f9f9f9; font-weight: normal" | 
|}

In certain expressions,  may represent "now" and  may represent "then".

Verbs
In literary Welsh, far less use is made of auxiliary verbs than in its colloquial counterpart. Instead conjugated forms of verbs are common. Most distinctively, the non-past tense is used for the present as well as the future.

The preterite, non-past (present-future), and imperfect (conditional) tenses have forms that are somewhat similar to colloquial Welsh, demonstrated here with  'pay'. There is a regular affection of the a to e before the endings -ais, -aist, -i, -ir and -id.

{| class="wikitable"
|- style="background: #efefef;"
| colspan="2" |
! scope="col" | Singular
! scope="col" | Plural
|-
! scope="row" rowspan="4" style="background: #efefef;" | Preterite
! scope="row" style="background: #efefef;" | First Person
| 
| 
|-
! scope="row" style="background: #efefef;" | Second Person
| 
| 
|-
! scope="row" style="background: #efefef;" | Third Person
| 
| 
|-
! scope="row" style="background: #efefef;" | Impersonal
| colspan=2 |  
|-
! scope="row" rowspan="4" style="background: #efefef;" | Non-Past
! scope="row" style="background: #efefef;" | First Person
| 
| 
|-
! scope="row" style="background: #efefef;" | Second Person
| 
| 
|-
! scope="row" style="background: #efefef;" | Third Person
| 
| 
|-
! scope="row" style="background: #efefef;" | Impersonal
| colspan=2 |  
|-
! scope="row" rowspan="4" style="background: #efefef;" | Imperfect
! scope="row" style="background: #efefef;" | First Person
| 
| 
|-
! scope="row" style="background: #efefef;" | Second Person
| 
| 
|-
! scope="row" style="background: #efefef;" | Third Person
| 
| 
|-
! scope="row" style="background: #efefef;" | Impersonal
| colspan=2 |  
|}

To these, the literary language adds pluperfect, subjunctive, and imperative forms with affection before -wyf and -wch.

{| class="wikitable"
|- style="background: #efefef;"
| colspan="2" |
! scope="col" | Singular
! scope="col" | Plural
|-
! scope="row" rowspan="4" style="background: #efefef;" | Pluperfect
! scope="row" style="background: #efefef;" | First Person
| 
| 
|-
! scope="row" style="background: #efefef;" | Second Person
| 
| 
|-
! scope="row" style="background: #efefef;" | Third Person
| 
| 
|-
! scope="row" style="background: #efefef;" | Impersonal
| colspan=2 | 
|-
! scope="row" rowspan="4" style="background: #efefef;" | Subjunctive
! scope="row" style="background: #efefef;" | First Person
| 
| 
|-
! scope="row" style="background: #efefef;" | Second Person
| 
| 
|-
! scope="row" style="background: #efefef;" | Third Person
| 
| 
|-
! scope="row" style="background: #efefef;" | Impersonal
| colspan=2 |  
|-
! scope="row" rowspan="4" style="background: #efefef;" | Imperative
! scope="row" style="background: #efefef;" | First Person
| (does not exist)
| 
|-
! scope="row" style="background: #efefef;" | Second Person
| 
| 
|-
! scope="row" style="background: #efefef;" | Third Person
| 
| 
|-
! scope="row" style="background: #efefef;" | Impersonal
| colspan=2 |  
|}

Irregular verbs

and compounds

Bod "to be" is highly irregular. Compared with the inflected tenses above, it has separate present and future tenses, separate present and imperfect subjunctive tenses, separate imperfect and conditional tenses, and uses the pluperfect as a consuetudinal imperfect (amherffaith arferiadol) tense. The third person of the present tense has separate existential (no plural because plural nouns take a singular verb) and descriptive forms, except in the situations where the positive or relative forms are used in their place.

{| class="wikitable"
|- style="background: #efefef;"
| colspan="2" |
! scope="col" | Singular
! scope="col" | Plural
|-
! scope="row" rowspan="4" style="background: #efefef;" | Preterite
! scope="row" style="background: #efefef;" | First Person
| 
| 
|-
! scope="row" style="background: #efefef;" | Second Person
| 
| 
|-
! scope="row" style="background: #efefef;" | Third Person
| 
| 
|-
! scope="row" style="background: #efefef;" | Impersonal
| colspan=2 |  
|-
! scope="row" rowspan="4" style="background: #efefef;" | Future
! scope="row" style="background: #efefef;" | First Person
| 
| 
|-
! scope="row" style="background: #efefef;" | Second Person
| 
| 
|-
! scope="row" style="background: #efefef;" | Third Person
| 
| 
|-
! scope="row" style="background: #efefef;" | Impersonal
| colspan=2 | 
|-
! scope="row" rowspan="4" style="background: #efefef;" | Present
! scope="row" style="background: #efefef;" | First Person
| 
| 
|-
! scope="row" style="background: #efefef;" | Second Person
| 
| 
|-
! scope="row" style="background: #efefef;" | Third Person
| 
| 
|-
! scope="row" style="background: #efefef;" | Impersonal
| colspan=2 | 
|}

{| class="wikitable"
|- style="background: #efefef;"
| colspan="2" |
! scope="col" | Singular
! scope="col" | Plural
|-
! scope="row" rowspan="4" style="background: #efefef;" | Imperfect
! scope="row" style="background: #efefef;" | First Person
| 
| 
|-
! scope="row" style="background: #efefef;" | Second Person
| 
| 
|-
! scope="row" style="background: #efefef;" | Third Person
| 
| 
|-
! scope="row" style="background: #efefef;" | Impersonal
| colspan=2 |  
|-
! scope="row" rowspan="4" style="background: #efefef;" | Conditional
! scope="row" style="background: #efefef;" | First Person
| 
| 
|-
! scope="row" style="background: #efefef;" | Second Person
| 
| 
|-
! scope="row" style="background: #efefef;" | Third Person
| 
| 
|-
! scope="row" style="background: #efefef;" | Impersonal
| colspan=2 |  
|-
! scope="row" rowspan="4" style="background: #efefef;" | Consuetudinal Imperfect
! scope="row" style="background: #efefef;" | First Person
| 
| 
|-
! scope="row" style="background: #efefef;" | Second Person
| 
| 
|-
! scope="row" style="background: #efefef;" | Third Person
| 
| 
|-
! scope="row" style="background: #efefef;" | Impersonal
| colspan=2 | 
|}

{| class="wikitable"
|- style="background: #efefef;"
| colspan="2" |
! scope="col" | Singular
! scope="col" | Plural
|-
! scope="row" rowspan="4" style="background: #efefef;" | Present Subjunctive
! scope="row" style="background: #efefef;" | First Person
| , 
| 
|-
! scope="row" style="background: #efefef;" | Second Person
| , 
| , 
|-
! scope="row" style="background: #efefef;" | Third Person
| 
| 
|-
! scope="row" style="background: #efefef;" | Impersonal
| colspan=2 |  
|-
! scope="row" rowspan="4" style="background: #efefef;" | Imperfect Subjunctive
! scope="row" style="background: #efefef;" | First Person
| 
| 
|-
! scope="row" style="background: #efefef;" | Second Person
| 
| 
|-
! scope="row" style="background: #efefef;" | Third Person
| 
| 
|-
! scope="row" style="background: #efefef;" | Impersonal
| colspan=2 |  
|-
! scope="row" rowspan="4" style="background: #efefef;" | Imperative
! scope="row" style="background: #efefef;" | First Person
| (does not exist)
| 
|-
! scope="row" style="background: #efefef;" | Second Person
| 
| 
|-
! scope="row" style="background: #efefef;" | Third Person
| 
| 
|-
! scope="row" style="background: #efefef;" | Impersonal
| colspan=2 |  
|}

Although the literary language tends toward keeping the particles in full, affirmative  is optional before .

That they both, like , separate the present and future tenses. A regular feature of this mood is the devoicing of b to p before the subjunctive endings,.

{| class="wikitable"
|- style="background: #efefef;"
| colspan="2" |
! scope="col" | Singular
! scope="col" | Plural
|-
! scope="row" rowspan="4" style="background: #efefef;" | Present
! scope="row" style="background: #efefef;" | First Person
| 
| 
|-
! scope="row" style="background: #efefef;" | Second Person
| 
| 
|-
! scope="row" style="background: #efefef;" | Third Person
| 
| 
|-
! scope="row" style="background: #efefef;" | Impersonal
| colspan=2 | 
|-
! scope="row" rowspan="4" style="background: #efefef;" | Imperfect
! scope="row" style="background: #efefef;" | First Person
| 
| 
|-
! scope="row" style="background: #efefef;" | Second Person
| 
| 
|-
! scope="row" style="background: #efefef;" | Third Person
| 
| 
|-
! scope="row" style="background: #efefef;" | Impersonal
| colspan=2 | 
|-
! scope="row" rowspan="4" style="background: #efefef;" | Present Subjunctive
! scope="row" style="background: #efefef;" | First Person
| 
| 
|-
! scope="row" style="background: #efefef;" | Second Person
| 
| 
|-
! scope="row" style="background: #efefef;" | Third Person
| 
| 
|-
! scope="row" style="background: #efefef;" | Impersonal
| colspan=2 | 
|-
! scope="row" rowspan="4" style="background: #efefef;" | Imperfect Subjunctive
! scope="row" style="background: #efefef;" | First Person
| 
| 
|-
! scope="row" style="background: #efefef;" | Second Person
| 
| 
|-
! scope="row" style="background: #efefef;" | Third Person
| 
| 
|-
! scope="row" style="background: #efefef;" | Impersonal
| colspan=2 | 
|-
! scope="row" rowspan="4" style="background: #efefef;" | Imperative
! scope="row" style="background: #efefef;" | First Person
| (does not exist)
| 
|-
! scope="row" style="background: #efefef;" | Second Person
| 
| 
|-
! scope="row" style="background: #efefef;" | Third Person
| 
| 
|-
! scope="row" style="background: #efefef;" | Impersonal
| colspan=2 | 
|}

{| class="wikitable"
|- style="background: #efefef;"
| colspan="2" |
! scope="col" | Singular
! scope="col" | Plural
|-
! scope="row" rowspan="4" style="background: #efefef;" | Present
! scope="row" style="background: #efefef;" | First Person
| 
| 
|-
! scope="row" style="background: #efefef;" | Second Person
| 
| 
|-
! scope="row" style="background: #efefef;" | Third Person
| , edwyn
| 
|-
! scope="row" style="background: #efefef;" | Impersonal
| colspan=2 | 
|-
! scope="row" rowspan="4" style="background: #efefef;" | Imperfect
! scope="row" style="background: #efefef;" | First Person
| 
| 
|-
! scope="row" style="background: #efefef;" | Second Person
| 
| 
|-
! scope="row" style="background: #efefef;" | Third Person
| 
| 
|-
! scope="row" style="background: #efefef;" | Impersonal
| colspan=2 | 
|-
! scope="row" rowspan="4" style="background: #efefef;" | Subjunctive
! scope="row" style="background: #efefef;" | First Person
| 
| 
|-
! scope="row" style="background: #efefef;" | Second Person
| 
| 
|-
! scope="row" style="background: #efefef;" | Third Person
| 
| 
|-
! scope="row" style="background: #efefef;" | Impersonal
| colspan=2 | 
|-
! scope="row" rowspan="4" style="background: #efefef;" | Imperative
! scope="row" style="background: #efefef;" | First Person
| (does not exist)
| 
|-
! scope="row" style="background: #efefef;" | Second Person
| 
| 
|-
! scope="row" style="background: #efefef;" | Third Person
| 
| 
|-
! scope="row" style="background: #efefef;" | Impersonal
| colspan=2 | 
|}

and 

The four verbs  "to go",  "to do",  "to get", and  "to come" are all irregular. These share many similarities, but there are also far more points of difference in their literary forms than in their spoken ones. In particular,  is significantly different from the others in the preterite and non-past tenses and is unusual for having no imperative mood.
{| class="wikitable"
|- style="background: #efefef;"
| rowspan="2" colspan="2" |
! colspan="2" scope="col" | 
! colspan="2" scope="col" | 
! colspan="2" scope="col" | 
! colspan="2" scope="col" | 
|- style="background: #efefef;"
! scope="col" | Singular
! scope="col" | Plural
! scope="col" | Singular
! scope="col" | Plural
! scope="col" | Singular
! scope="col" | Plural
! scope="col" | Singular
! scope="col" | Plural
|-
! rowspan="4" scope="row" style="background: #efefef;" | Preterite
! scope="row" style="background: #efefef;" | First Person
| 
| 
| 
| 
| 
| 
| 
| 
|-
! scope="row" style="background: #efefef;" | Second Person
| 
| 
| 
| 
| 
| 
| 
| 
|-
! scope="row" style="background: #efefef;" | Third Person
| 
| 
| 
| 
| 
| 
| 
| 
|-
! scope="row" style="background: #efefef;" | Impersonal
| colspan=2 |  
| colspan=2 | 
| colspan=2 |  
| colspan=2 |  
|-
! rowspan="4" scope="row" style="background: #efefef;" | Non-past
! scope="row" style="background: #efefef;" | First Person
| 
| 
| 
| 
| 
| 
| 
| 
|-
! scope="row" style="background: #efefef;" | Second Person
| 
| 
| 
| 
| 
| 
| 
| 
|-
! scope="row" style="background: #efefef;" | Third Person
| 
| 
| 
| 
| 
| 
| 
| 
|-
! scope="row" style="background: #efefef;" | Impersonal
| colspan=2 | 
| colspan=2 | 
| colspan=2 | 
| colspan=2 | 
|-
! rowspan="4" scope="row" style="background: #efefef;" | Imperfect
! scope="row" style="background: #efefef;" | First Person
| 
| 
| 
| 
| 
| 
| 
| 
|-
! scope="row" style="background: #efefef;" | Second Person
| 
| 
| 
| 
| 
| 
| 
| 
|-
! scope="row" style="background: #efefef;" | Third Person
| 
| 
| 
| 
| 
| 
| 
| 
|-
! scope="row" style="background: #efefef;" | Impersonal
| colspan=2 | 
| colspan=2 | 
| colspan=2 | 
| colspan=2 | 
|-
! rowspan="4" scope="row" style="background: #efefef;" | Pluperfect
! scope="row" style="background: #efefef;" | First Person
| 
| 
| 
| 
| 
| 
| 
| 
|-
! scope="row" style="background: #efefef;" | Second Person
| 
| 
| 
| 
| 
| 
| 
| 
|-
! scope="row" style="background: #efefef;" | Third Person
| 
| 
| 
| 
| 
| 
| 
| 
|-
! scope="row" style="background: #efefef;" | Impersonal
| colspan=2 | 
| colspan=2 | 
| colspan=2 | 
| colspan=2 | 
|-
! rowspan="4" scope="row" style="background: #efefef;" | (Present) Subjunctive
! scope="row" style="background: #efefef;" | First Person
| 
| 
| 
| 
| 
| 
| 
| 
|-
! scope="row" style="background: #efefef;" | Second Person
| 
| 
| 
| 
| 
| 
| 
| 
|-
! scope="row" style="background: #efefef;" | Third Person
| 
| 
| 
| 
| 
| 
| 
| 
|-
! scope="row" style="background: #efefef;" | Impersonal
| colspan=2 | 
| colspan=2 | 
| colspan=2 | 
| colspan=2 | 
|-
! rowspan="4" scope="row" style="background: #efefef;" | Imperfect Subjunctive
! scope="row" style="background: #efefef;" | First Person
| 
| 
| 
| 
| 
| 
| (Same as Imperfect)
| (Same as Imperfect)
|-
! scope="row" style="background: #efefef;" | Second Person
| 
| 
| 
| 
| 
| 
| (Same as Imperfect)
| (Same as Imperfect)
|-
! scope="row" style="background: #efefef;" | Third Person
| 
| 
| 
| 
| 
| 
| (Same as Imperfect)
| (Same as Imperfect)
|-
! scope="row" style="background: #efefef;" | Impersonal
| colspan=2 | 
| colspan=2 | 
| colspan=2 | 
| colspan=2 | (Same as Imperfect)
|-
! rowspan="4" scope="row" style="background: #efefef;" | Imperative
! scope="row" style="background: #efefef;" | First Person
| (none)
| 
| (none)
| 
| (none)
| (none)
| (none)
| 
|-
! scope="row" style="background: #efefef;" | Second Person
| 
| 
| 
| 
| (none)
| (none)
| 
| 
|-
! scope="row" style="background: #efefef;" | Third Person
| 
| 
| 
| 
| (none)
| (none)
| 
| 
|-
! scope="row" style="background: #efefef;" | Impersonal
| colspan=2 | 
| colspan=2 | 
| colspan=2 | (none)
| colspan=2 | 
|}

Prepositions
In Welsh, prepositions frequently change their form when followed by a pronoun. These are known as inflected prepositions. They fall into three main conjugations.

Firstly those in -a- (at, am (stem: amdan-), ar, tan/dan):

{| class="wikitable"
|- style="background: #efefef;"
| colspan="2" |
! scope="col" | Singular
! scope="col" | Plural
|-
! colspan="2" scope="row" | First Person
| 
| 
|-
! colspan="2" scope="row" | Second Person
| 
| 
|-
! rowspan="2" scope="row" | Third Person
! scope="row" | Masculine
| 
| rowspan="2" | 
|-
! scope="row" | Feminine
| 
|}

Secondly those in -o- (er, heb, rhag, rhwng (stem: rhyng-), tros/dros, trwy/drwy (stem: trw-/drw-), o (stem: ohon-), yn). All apart from o add a linking element in the third person (usually -dd-, but -ydd- in the case of trwy/drwy, and -t- in the case of tros/dros):

{| class="wikitable"
|- style="background: #efefef;"
| colspan="2" |
! scope="col" | Singular
! scope="col" | Plural
|-
! colspan="2" scope="row" | First Person
| 
| 
|-
! colspan="2" scope="row" | Second Person
| 
| 
|-
! rowspan="2" scope="row" | Third Person
! scope="row" | Masculine
| 
| rowspan="2" | 
|-
! scope="row" | Feminine
| 
|}

Thirdly, those in -y- (gan and wrth). Gan includes both vowel changes and a linking element, while wrth has neither:

{| class="wikitable"
|- style="background: #efefef;"
| colspan="2" |
! scope="col" | Singular
! scope="col" | Plural
|-
! colspan="2" scope="row" | First Person
| 
| 
|-
! colspan="2" scope="row" | Second Person
| 
| 
|-
! rowspan="2" scope="row" | Third Person
! scope="row" | Masculine
| 
| rowspan="2" | 
|-
! scope="row" | Feminine
| 
|}

Finally, the preposition i is highly irregular:

{| class="wikitable"
|- style="background: #efefef;"
| colspan="2" |
! scope="col" | Singular
! scope="col" | Plural
|-
! colspan="2" scope="row" | First Person
| 
| 
|-
! colspan="2" scope="row" | Second Person
| 
| 
|-
! rowspan="2" scope="row" | Third Person
! scope="row" | Masculine
| 
| rowspan="2" | 
|-
! scope="row" | Feminine
| 
|}

All inflected prepositions may optionally be followed by the appropriate personal pronouns, apart from i, where this is only possible in the third person, thanks to its proper endings in the other persons sounding the same as the pronouns. In slightly less formal Welsh, the endings are split off the first and second persons of i to be interpreted as pronouns instead, although this creates the anomalous pronoun mi.

The majority of prepositions (am, ar, at, gan, heb, hyd, i, o, tan/dan, tros/dros, trwy/drwy, wrth) trigger the soft mutation. The exceptions are â, gyda, and tua, which cause the aspirate mutation; yn, which causes the nasal mutation; and cyn, ger, mewn, rhag, and rhwng, which do not cause any mutation.

Notes

References 
Jones, Morgan D. A Guide to Correct Welsh (Llandysul: Gomer, 1976). .
King, G. (2003). Modern Welsh. Oxford: Routledge. 
Lewis, D. Geraint. Y Llyfr Berfau (Llandysul: Gomer, 1995). .
Thomas, Peter Wynn. Gramadeg y Gymraeg (Cardiff: UWP, 1996). .

Welsh grammar